Henry Thomas Pelham, 3rd Earl of Chichester DL (25 August 1804 – 15 March 1886), styled Lord Pelham until 1826, was an English peer.

Background and education
Pelham was born on Stratton Street, Piccadilly, the son of Thomas Pelham, 2nd Earl of Chichester and Lady Mary Henrietta Juliana Osborne. He was educated at Westminster School and Trinity College, Cambridge.

Military career
Pelham was commissioned a cornet in the 6th (Inniskilling) Dragoons on 24 June 1824, transferring to the Royal Horse Guards on 14 October of that year. He succeeded his father as Earl of Chichester in 1826. He became a Deputy Lieutenant of Sussex on 5 April 1827, and was promoted lieutenant on 28 April, becoming an unattached captain on 3 April 1828. Chichester was promoted to major in 1841 and retired from the army in 1844.

Public life
Lord Chichester served as an Ecclesiastical Commissioner from 1841 to 1886, as President of the Royal Agricultural Society in 1849 and as Lord Lieutenant of Sussex from 1860 to 1886. He also demolished and rebuilt Stanmer Church.

Family
Lord Chichester married Lady Mary Brudenell, daughter of Robert Brudenell, 6th Earl of Cardigan, at St. Mary's Church, Cadogan Street, London, on 18 August 1828. They had seven children:

 Lady Harriet Mary Pelham (1829 – 4 September 1905), married John Bligh, 6th Earl of Darnley.
 Lady Susan Emma Pelham (1831–1875), married Abel Smith.
 Lady Isabella Charlotte Pelham (1836 – 11 December 1916), married Samuel Whitbread.
 Walter John Pelham, 4th Earl of Chichester (1838–1902).
 Rev. Francis Godolphin Pelham, 5th Earl of Chichester (1844–1905).
 Hon. Thomas Henry William Pelham (21 December 1847 – 23 December 1916), who was involved in the early boys' clubs movement.
 Hon. Arthur Lowther Pelham (28 December 1850 – 12 February 1929).

Lord Chichester died at the family estate of Stanmer Park and was succeeded by his eldest son Walter.

References

thePeerage.com

External links

1804 births
1886 deaths
6th (Inniskilling) Dragoons officers
Deputy Lieutenants of Sussex
Earls of Chichester
Royal Horse Guards officers
Lord-Lieutenants of Sussex
People educated at Westminster School, London
Alumni of Trinity College, Cambridge
Henry
Church Estates Commissioners